Hiroshi Gohda (born 10 October 1964) is a Japanese professional golfer.

Gohda played on the Japan Golf Tour, winning once.

Professional wins (4)

Japan Golf Tour wins (1)

Japan Challenge Tour wins (3)
1987 Mito Green Open
1992 Korakuen Cup (1st), Sports Shinko Open

Results in major championships

CUT = missed the half-way cut
Note: Gohda only played in The Open Championship.

Team appearances
World Cup (representing Japan): 1995

External links

Japanese male golfers
Japan Golf Tour golfers
Sportspeople from Hyōgo Prefecture
1964 births
Living people